AGROVOC is a multilingual controlled vocabulary covering all areas of interest of the Food and Agriculture Organization of the United Nations (FAO), including food, nutrition, agriculture, fisheries, forestry and the environment. By November 2021, the vocabulary consisted of over 39,600 concepts with up to 924,000 terms in up to 41 different languages (see ). It is a collaborative effort, edited by a community of experts and coordinated by FAO. AGROVOC is made available by FAO as an RDF/SKOS-XL concept scheme and published as a linked data set aligned to 20 other vocabularies.

History
AGROVOC was first published at the beginning of the 1980s by FAO in English, Spanish and French to serve as a controlled vocabulary to index publications in agricultural science and technology, especially for the International System for Agricultural Science and Technology (AGRIS). In the 1990s, AGROVOC abandoned paper printing and went digital with data storage handled by a relational database. In 2004, preliminary experiments with expressing AGROVOC into the Web Ontology Language (OWL) took place. At the same time a web based editing tool was developed, then called WorkBench, nowadays VocBench. In 2009 AGROVOC became an SKOS resource.

Usage
Today, AGROVOC is available in different languages as an SKOS-XL concept scheme and published as a Linked Open Data (LOD). It is used for or organizing knowledge for subsequent data retrieval, tagging content in websites, facilitating search engine discovery, standardizing agricultural information data and as reference for translations, and in fields such as data mining, big data, or artificial intelligence. Updated AGROVOC content is released once a month and is available for public use.

Access
AGROVOC is accessible in various ways:

 Browse online: Search and browse AGROVOC concepts via the SKOSMOS interface.  
 Download: RDF-SKOS (AGROVOC only or AGROVOC LOD). 
 Live: SPARQL endpoint
 AGROVOC Web services.

Maintenance
FAO coordinates the editorial activities related to the maintenance of AGROVOC. Content curation is carried out by a community of editors and institutions for each of the language versions. The tool used by the community to edit and maintain AGROVOC is VocBench, which was designed to meet the needs of the Semantic Web and linked data environments. FAO also facilitates the technical maintenance of AGROVOC, including its publication as a LOD resource. Technical support and infrastructure is provided by the University of Tor Vergata (Rome, Italy) which leads the technical development of VocBench.

Copyright and license
Copyright for AGROVOC content in FAO languages - English, French, Spanish, Arabic, Russian and Chinese - is with FAO, while content in other languages rests with the institutions that authored it. AGROVOC thesaurus content in English, Russian, French, Spanish, Arabic and Chinese is licensed under the international Creative Commons Attribution License (CC-BY IGO 3.0).

Related links
 Agricultural Information Management Standards
 AGRIS
 Food and Agriculture Organization of the United Nations

External links
 AGRIS
 AGROVOC
 AIMS
 FAO
 VocBench/Agricultural Ontology Server

Further reading
 AGROVOC Publications

References

Agricultural databases
Knowledge representation
Ontology (information science)
Food and Agriculture Organization
Thesauri